John Rolli is a retired college men's ice hockey coach.  Rolli graduated from Salem State College in 1973. He was the head hockey coach at the University of Massachusetts Dartmouth from 1985 until 2016.

Career
Rolli headed the program for 38 years, becoming one of college hockey's most successful coaches. While in the third-tier ECAC conference, Rolli led the Corsairs to numerous conference championships while the league went through several rebrandings. Massachusetts Dartmouth left the conference in 2009 when the school's primary conference, MASCAC, began sponsoring ice hockey. He saw a great deal less success in the new league, posting the only losing records of his career, but he still managed to lead UMD to a pair of titles.

Upon his retirement in 2017, Rolli ranked 14th all-time among college men's ice hockey coaches. He sits 17th all-time as of 2021. Of the coaches who have won at least 400 games, Rolli ranks 3rd all time in winning percentage.

Head Coaching Record

See also
List of college men's ice hockey coaches with 400 wins

References

Living people
University of Massachusetts Dartmouth faculty
Salem State University alumni
Year of birth missing (living people)